Middleton may refer to:

Middleton, Columbiana County, Ohio
Middleton Township, Wood County, Ohio

See also
Middleton Township, Ohio (disambiguation)
Middletown, Ohio